Válber da Silva Costa (born 6 December 1971), better known as just Válber, is a former Brazilian football player.

Club statistics

References

External links

1977 births
Living people
Brazilian footballers
Brazilian expatriate footballers
Mogi Mirim Esporte Clube players
Sport Club Corinthians Paulista players
Sociedade Esportiva Palmeiras players
Sport Club Internacional players
CR Vasco da Gama players
Goiás Esporte Clube players
Associação Atlética Ponte Preta players
Club Athletico Paranaense players
Santa Cruz Futebol Clube players
Expatriate footballers in Japan
J1 League players
Yokohama Flügels players
Yokohama F. Marinos players
Association football forwards